OWP may refer to:
Obóz Wielkiej Polski or Camp of Great Poland, a political organization in interwar Poland
Optimum Wellness Plan, an enrollment-based preventative veterinary care package